Mary is a 1994 dramatised documentary from Australia about Mary MacKillop, from a concept by Julie Macken.

The film follows the career of MacKillop in a series of short dramatizations interspersed with commentaries. It was filmed "on location" in Sydney (only) and The Vatican, Rome.

The film features commentary by Claire Dunne, author of No Plaster Saint (credited as "Clair Dunn") and Sister Marie Foale, author of The Josephite Story, also interviews with Peter Gumpel S.J. - Saintmaker and Relator of Mary's Cause, and Sister Margaret McKenna - Mary Mackillop Secretariat.
The book "Mary MacKillop Unveiled" by Lesley O'Brien was mentioned in the closing credits.

Cast
Lucy Bell as Mary MacKillop
Rebecca Scully-Webster as the young Mary MacKillop
Linden Wilkinson as the older Mary MacKillop
Brendan Higgins as Father Julian Woods
Brian Harrison as Bishop Laurence Sheil
Maureen Green as Sister Teresa
Brian McDermott as Bishop James Quinn
Stephen Leeder as Father Charles Horan
Frank Garfield as Bishop Reynolds
Roslyn Oades as Sister Paula
Vanessa Downing as Flora MacKillop (mother of Mary MacKillop)
Ron Zines as Bishop Matthew Quinn
Tommaso Monacelli as Pope Pius IX

Home media
The film was released on DVD as Mary: The Mary MacKillop Story by Roadshow Entertainment.

References

External links

Mary at Oz Movies
Interview with Kay Pavlou

1994 films
Australian documentary films
1994 documentary films
1990s English-language films